Trichopterolophia is a genus of longhorn beetles of the subfamily Lamiinae, containing the following species:

 Trichopterolophia andamanica Breuning, 1960
 Trichopterolophia schurmanni Breuning, 1980

References

Pteropliini